Poly Bridge 2 is a simulation-puzzle game developed and published by Dry Cactus, with music composed by Adrian Talens. It is the sequel to the critically acclaimed Poly Bridge. It is available worldwide for Linux, macOS, Microsoft Windows, Android, and iOS.

Gameplay

The objective of Poly Bridge 2 is building a bridge that is able to take vehicles from place A to place B with materials provided within a limited budget. In addition to the materials that were already featured in Poly Bridge, a new material, the spring, is introduced. The game offers six different worlds which consist of 16 levels each, along with five "challenge worlds" consisting of harder versions of the levels contained in the first five worlds, adding up to a total of 176 levels. The addition of a feature similar to the Steam Workshop allows players to make and upload their own levels for other players to enjoy. This workshop service is hosted on Dry Cactus's servers, making the game compatible with other launchers such as the Epic Games Store, whereas Poly Bridge's workshop was hosted on the Steam Workshop and was thus restricted to the Steam launcher.

Development and release
Poly Bridge 2 is developed and published by New Zealand-based video game developer Dry Cactus, with Canadian composer Adrian Talens returning to compose the original soundtrack. The game was released on Epic Games Store and Steam on 28 May 2020 for Linux, macOS and Microsoft Windows. It released with four regular worlds and four challenge worlds, with two additional normal worlds and one challenge world added on 2 August 2020. A mobile version of Poly Bridge 2 was released 26 October 2020 for Android, and 27 October 2020 for iOS.

A sequel, titled Poly Bridge 3 is set to be released on 30 May 2023.

Soundtrack

Reception

Poly Bridge 2 received "mixed or average" reviews, according to review aggregator Metacritic; however, the game has received "Overwhelmingly Positive" reviews on Steam, with a score of 96/100 and 2,852 reviews as of 22 March 2021. It has earned a rating of 4.83/5 stars on the Google Play store and 4.43/5 stars on the App Store.

Russell Archey of Gaming Nexus rated the game 8.5 out of 10. He felt the game was enjoyable and relaxing, and brought him a lot of happiness every time the bridge he built broke and drivers drove into the water.

Chris O'Connor of Impulse Gamer gave the game an overall 3.6 stars out of 5. He praised the game for being good fun at a pretty reasonable price, but criticised it for not having enough stages.

John Walker of Rock, Paper, Shotgun commented the game is "far more like an expansion pack than a whole new game", and thought it difficult to enjoy if creating on one's own.

References

External links

2020 video games
Android (operating system) games
Construction and management simulation games
iOS games
Linux games
MacOS games
Puzzle video games
Single-player video games
Video games developed in New Zealand
Video game sequels
Windows games
Dry Cactus games